= Jing Xiao =

Jing Xiao is a professor of robotics and head of the Department of Robotics Engineering at Worcester Polytechnic Institute (WPI). She is the director of the Adaptive and Intelligent Robotics Lab, and the site director of WPI's ROSE-HUB. Xiao was named a Fellow of the Institute of Electrical and Electronics Engineers (IEEE) in 2013 for her contributions to robot compliant motion and haptic interaction. Xiao has also served as Associate Dean for Research and Graduate Studies and Program Director of the Computing and Information Systems Ph.D. Program while serving as a professor of computer science at University of North Carolina at Charlotte (UNC-Charlotte).
